Gregorio Manuel Salvador Elá (born 9 September 1981), also known as Gregorio, is an Equatoguinean retired footballer who played as a defender. He was a member of Equatorial Guinea national team. He also holds Spanish citizenship.

Personal life
Gregorio, who also holds Spanish citizenship, is mulatto. His father (white), Juan Salvador, is of Spanish origin and his mother (black), Purificación Elá, is a fang women from Equatorial Guinea. His brother, Chupe, is also a footballer.

References

External links

FutbolEsta.com 

1981 births
Living people
People from Mongomo
Equatoguinean people of Spanish descent
Equatoguinean footballers
Association football defenders
UD Almería B players
Tercera División players
Divisiones Regionales de Fútbol players
Equatoguinean emigrants to Spain
Equatorial Guinea international footballers